"Anima mia" is a 1973 song composed by Antonello De Sanctis, Flavio Paulin and Ivano Michetti and performed by the musical group Cugini di campagna. The first top ten hit in the band's career, the song got an additional gold disc in 1997, when it named a nostalgia-based Rai 2 variety show presented by Fabio Fazio and Claudio Baglioni.

"Anima mia" was covered by numerous artists, including  ABBA singer Anni-Frid Lyngstad (as "Ett liv i solen", included in her album Frida ensam), Dalida, Bobby Rydell, Claudio Baglioni, Piergiorgio Farina, Gianni Meccia.

Track listing

 7" single – QSP 1004
 "Anima mia"  (Antonello De Sanctis, Flavio Paulin, Ivano Michetti)
 "Te la dico" (Bruno Zambrini, Gianni Meccia)

Charts

References

 

1973 singles
Italian songs
1973 songs